Marc Audineau (born 2 June 1971) is a French yacht racer who competed in the 2004 Summer Olympics.

References

External links 
 
 
 
 

1971 births
Living people
French male sailors (sport)
Olympic sailors of France
Sailors at the 2004 Summer Olympics – 49er
21st-century French people